Pärnu is an urban municipality of Estonia, in Pärnu County. It comprises the town of Pärnu and settlements of former parishes of Audru, Paikuse and Tõstamaa.

Settlements
town
Pärnu

boroughs
Audru, Tõstamaa, Paikuse and Lavassaare

villages
Ahaste, Alu, Aruvälja, Eassalu, Ermistu, Jõõpre, Kabriste, Kastna, Kavaru, Kihlepa, Kiraste, Kõima, Kõpu, Kärbu, Lao, Lemmetsa, Liiva, Lindi, Liu, Lõuka, Malda, Manija, Marksa, Männikuste, Oara, Papsaare, Peerni, Pootsi, Põhara, Põldeotsa, Põlendmaa, Päraküla, Rammuka, Ranniku, Ridalepa, Saari, Saulepa, Seliste, Seljametsa, Silla, Soeva, Soomra, Tammuru, Tuuraste, Tõhela, Tõlli, Valgeranna, Vaskrääma, Värati.

Administration
Local administration consists of the city council and the city government. City council elections take place every four years.  The number of councillors depends on the population. The current number of councillors are 39.

Twin towns – sister cities

Pärnu is twinned with:

 Gran, Norway
 Helsingborg, Sweden

 Jelgava, Latvia
 Ocean City, United States
 Oskarshamn, Sweden
 Portsmouth, United States
 Šiauliai, Lithuania
 Siófok, Hungary
 Södertälje, Sweden
 Vaasa, Finland

Citizens of honour
 1886 Konstantin Possiet
 1901 Friedrich Fromhold Martens
 1934 Konstantin Päts
 2007 Neeme Järvi
 2008 Valter Ojakäär
 2009 Jüri Jaanson

References

External links

Pärnu County
Municipalities of Estonia